One Chance is the debut album from British tenor Paul Potts. He won Britain's Got Talent on 17 June 2007, and the album was released on 16 July 2007 by Syco Music.

Commercial performance
The album reached number one on the UK Albums Chart. The album had been at #1 from its release until 12 August, and it was certified platinum.

In Australia, the album opened at #4 on the ARIA Top 50 Albums Chart. It has so far reached Gold Status (35,000 copies sold). Four weeks later (2 September 2007), it reached #1.

In New Zealand, the album debuted at #1 on 6 August 2007 and was certified Gold in its first week, selling over 7,500 copies. The album was certified Platinum in its second week on the chart selling over 15,000 copies, and 2× Platinum after four weeks with sales of over 30,000 copies. The album spent twenty-three weeks on the chart, including six consecutive weeks at #1.

Track listing
 "Nessun dorma" - composed by Giacomo Puccini, from the opera Turandot
 "Time to Say Goodbye" - composed by Francesco Sartori and lyrics by Lucio Quarantotto
 "Amapola" - composed by Joseph LaCalle
 "Everybody Hurts (Ognuno Soffre)" - composed by R.E.M.
 "Caruso" - composed by Lucio Dalla
 "Nella Fantasia" - composed by Ennio Morricone and lyrics by Chiara Ferraù
 "Por Ti Sere" - composed by Rolf Løvland and lyrics by Brendan Graham
 "A Mi Manera" - composed by Jacques Revaux
 "Cavatina" - composed by Stanley Myers and lyrics by Cleo Laine
 "The Music of the Night" - composed by Andrew Lloyd Webber and lyrics by Charles Hart and Richard Stilgoe, from the musical The Phantom of the Opera

Charts

Weekly charts

Year-end charts

Certifications and sales

References
 

Paul Potts albums
2007 debut albums
Columbia Records albums
Syco Music albums
Classical crossover albums